Hans Einn was an East German luger who competed in the early 1980s. He won the silver medal in the men's doubles event at the 1982 FIL European Luge Championships in Winterberg, West Germany.

References
List of European luge champions  

German male lugers
Living people
Year of birth missing (living people)